God of This City is an album by contemporary Christian band Bluetree. It was released on March 3, 2009 and charted at No. 103 on the Billboard 200. It is essentially a restyled and edited version of the band's debut release Greater Things.

Track listing
 "Life's Noise" (Aaron Boyd) – 7:30
 "God's Plan" (Boyd) – 4:35 
 "For You" (Boyd) – 5:06
 "God of This City" (Bluetree) – 7:09
 "Your Love" (Boyd) – 6:37 
 "Each Day" (Boyd) – 4:07
 "When I Survey" (Isaac Watts / Lowell Mason) – 5:02
 "Oh My God" (Boyd) – 1:03
 "River" (Boyd) – 7:25 
 "Who Has Held?" (Boyd) – 5:11
 "Burn Me Up" (Boyd) – 5:40
 "Standing Out" (Boyd / Richard Bleakley) – 4:56
 "Your Love (Strings Mix)" (Boyd) – 6:18

Personnel
 Aaron Boyd – lead vocals, guitar
 Peter Kernoghan – DJ loops
 Ian Jordan – piano, synthesizers
 Rick Bleakley – lead guitar, backing vocals
 Andrew McCann – bass guitar
 Peter Comfort – drums

References

2009 debut albums
Bluetree albums